Good Apollo, I'm Burning Star IV, Volume One: From Fear Through the Eyes of Madness is a graphic novel released in September 2005 along with the Coheed and Cambria album of the same name.  It is written by Claudio Sanchez, illustrated by Christopher Shy, and published by Evil Ink Comics. In 2017, it was rebooted with Sanchez's wife, Chondra added as a writer and Rags Morales as the main artist and Emilio Lopez as the colorist. This version goes into more depth with the story then the previous edition. The project finished in 2019 and an Ultimate Edition was released.

Plot

The story of Good Apollo takes a step outside the science fiction narrative of the first three chapters and examines the life of the Writer, a character who is crafting the lives of the protagonist Claudio and his companions in the form of a fictional story.  The graphic novel alternates between the two different worlds of Claudio the Writer and Claudio the Character, which can be confusing for one unacquainted with the concept as the Writer and Character are similar in appearance.

The novel opens with a dream taking place in the mind of Claudio the Character, in which he sits in priest's garb in the Writer's study looking upon the phrase "God Only Knows" scrawled in front of him in blood (a line repeated in the song "Mother May I").  He is approached by several skeletal figures begging for Claudio to save them.  As their protests become more emphatic and they begin to overwhelm Claudio, he realizes he is dreaming and forces himself to awaken by stabbing himself in the hand with a screwdriver.  Aboard his uncle Jesse's ship, the Grail Arbor, he explains the dreams to Jesse and his daughter Chase as the enslaved souls of the Keywork pleading for liberation.  Jesse and Chase (who appears to have some prophetic power) believe the only way to free them is by destroying Heaven's Fence and that Claudio is a messiah-like figure called the Crowing who has the power to do this.  Claudio, however, is having trouble accepting this daunting role.

The novel's focus now shifts to the Writer, who resides in Rockland County, New York.  He is haunted by memories of a former lover, Erica Court, who had been unfaithful.  The Writer suffers a series of delusions involving the death of Erica at his hands.  These visions make up the song "Welcome Home" on the Good Apollo album.  Suddenly, the Writer's window is broken and then someone apparently steals his ten-speed bicycle.  As the Writer walks off to investigate, the novel re-enters the story with an exchange between the story's villains, Supreme Tri-Mage Wilhelm Ryan and his General, Mayo Deftinwolf, in which they vaguely speak of Claudio's role as the Crowing and their plans to crush him and the rebellion his uncle Jesse has been leading against the Mages of Heaven's Fence.  Back aboard the Grail Arbor, Claudio is awakened from a nightmare about his lost family by the Prise Ambellina.  They discuss a plan formulated by Jesse to penetrate the defenses of Apity Prime, a planet in the Omega star system, by landing in the city of Kalline, which is adjacent to Wilhem's lair, the House Atlantic.  Claudio needs to get there to fulfill his destiny as the Crowing, however he points out that the opening in the defenses is likely a trap and argues further with Chase and Ambellina about his role, which he still doubts.  Jesse explains the plan to the pilot of the Grail Arbor, who also expresses doubts, and the group prepares for the final assault on the forces of Wilhelm Ryan.

In the Writer's world, he has wandered off into deeper hallucinations, arriving at the house of Newo Ikkin, a fictional character from his story and his character's former love interest, and witnessing Claudio the character speak to Newo's dog Apollo, as he had written in his story before (Claudio utters the phrase "Good Apollo, where shall I begin?"  At the end of the first track on In Keeping Secrets of Silent Earth: 3, The Ring In Return, one can hear a voice quietly saying "Hello Apollo.  Where shall I begin?"  It's believed the slight differentiation was accidental).  In Newo's place is Erica Court, and the Writer's bicycle has taken on a demonic persona, Ten Speed of God's Blood and Burial, and begins speaking with him.  The Writer is seeking a way to end the story, which Ten Speed claims he can provide if he kills Ambellina (though the Writer thinks Ten Speed wants him to kill Erica).  Exact quotes of their bickering can be heard during part of the song, "Ten Speed (Of God's Blood and Burial)," from the Good Apollo album.  The exchange ends with Claudio saying "You say a lot of things.  And how's that work?  You're a bicycle."

Meanwhile, a rebel strike team has disabled the generator on Kalline, allowing the Grail Arbor to land.  Mayo springs his trap, destroying the strike force by unleashing one of the beast-like Priests upon them.  As the Arbor prepares to land, more of the Writer's delusions are portrayed, including Erica's murder at the hands of the Writer using the same poison Mayo gave to Coheed to kill his children in the Second Stage Turbine Blade.  This delusion makes up the song "Once Upon Your Dead Body" on the Good Apollo album.  While Mayo prepares for the rebel's ground assault, Ten Speed explains that he doesn't actually want the Writer to murder Erica, but rather to exact his vengeance metaphorically by killing Ambellina, who represents Erica's good side in the story, which will in turn cause Claudio to accept his destiny as the Crowing and destroy the Keywork; an ending for the story.

Mayo's trap comes to full fruition as a planetary defense cannon called a Jackhammer is fired into the Grail Arbor when it tries to land, damaging it.  The Arbor retreats while Claudio, Ambellina, Jesse, Chase, and Jesse's other IRO-bot children abandon ship and land on the surface of Apity Prime.  Ambellina and Claudio split off from the group while Jesse and his children stay behind to confront Mayo.  As Ten Speed and the Writer further argue about the fate of Ambellina, Jesse delivers a final goodbye to his children who proceed to mutate into monstrous forms and attack Mayo's forces.  Jesse confronts Mayo and is killed by him in hand-to-hand combat when Mayo rips Jesse's heart out of his body.

Claudio and Ambellina arrive at a mirror (the Willing Well) in which they can see the Writer's argument with Ten Speed take place. Claudio and Ambellina then combat a Priest in front of the mirror, resulting in Ambellina being injured. As the battle takes place, the Writer is swept further into his delusion by the skeletal figures the Character dreamt of earlier, who, apparently at the behest of a hallucinated Erica Court, take him to a large, winged guillotine and have him beheaded. Erica hauntingly says "This is no beginning. This is the final cut"—a phrase repeated as the chorus of the song "The Willing Well IV: The Final Cut" on the Good Apollo album. The Writer awakens from this delusion, once again finding himself at the house of Newo Ikkin, and decides to take Ten Speed's advice.  Passing through the mirror into his own story, the Writer sees Claudio has made the transformation into his powerful role as the Crowing after witnessing Ambellina's injury at the hands of the Priest. Ignoring the Writer's command to stop, Claudio kills the Priest and proceeds to confront the Writer.  The Writer explains he must kill Ambellina for his own peace of mind, so that the story may have an ending. The Crowing furiously declares, "My God is a coward!" The Writer kills Ambellina, easily overwhelming Claudio's resistance despite his newfound power as the Crowing. As Ambellina dies in Claudio's arms, she professes that she would have loved Claudio had she been able. The Writer walks off into the distance with his bicycle, leaving Claudio with the cryptic message "You're Burning Star IV." He also tells Claudio to listen to the Vishual (Chase) and that "all worlds from here must burn," implying that it is the Crowing's duty to destroy the Keywork.

See also
Coheed and Cambria
Claudio Sanchez
The Amory Wars

References

External links
Coheed and Cambria official website

The Amory Wars
2005 graphic novels
2005 comics debuts
American graphic novels
Metafictional comics